Sebastonyma is a genus of grass skippers in the family Hesperiidae.

Species
Sebastonyma dolopia (Hewitson, 1868) - Himalayas, Sikkim to Burma, northern Thailand, Laos
Sebastonyma perbella (Hering, 1918) - China
Sebastonyma pudens Evans, 1937 - Burma, northern Thailand
Sebastonyma suthepiana Murayama & Kimura, 1990 - northern Thailand, Laos
Sebastonyma medoensis Lee, 1979 - China
 S. m. medoensis  Tibet
 S. m. albostriata Huang, 2003 Yunnan

References
Natural History Museum Lepidoptera genus database

Hesperiinae
Hesperiidae genera
Taxa named by Edward Yerbury Watson